Reggaeton de Markesina is the compilation album of Maldy of the duo Plan B.

Track listing

2007 albums
Reggaeton albums